Cluny is a commune in the eastern French department of Saône-et-Loire, in the region of Bourgogne-Franche-Comté.

The town grew up around the Benedictine Abbey of Cluny, founded by Duke William I of Aquitaine in 910. The height of Cluniac influence was from the second half of the 10th century through the early 12th. The abbey was sacked by the Huguenots in 1562, and many of its valuable manuscripts were destroyed or removed.

Geography
The river Grosne flows northward through the commune and crosses the town.

See also
 Cluniac Reforms
 Communes of the Saône-et-Loire department

References

External links

 Official website (in French)

 
Communes of Saône-et-Loire
Burgundy